Creative Eye Limited is an Indian Media conglomerate integrated media and entertainment company. The company was launched in a private sector in 1986, but became a public limited company in 1996. The company is listed under Bombay Stock Exchange, National Stock Exchange of India, Bloomberg L.P., and also on Reuters Group.

Television
Creative Eye started off producing television content for Indian public broadcaster Doordarshan network in 1986. Following is a list of television programmes produced by CREATIVEYE:

References

Mass media companies of India
Companies based in Mumbai
Entertainment companies of India
Television production companies of India
Film organisations in India
Entertainment companies established in 1986
1986 establishments in Maharashtra
Indian companies established in 1986
Companies listed on the National Stock Exchange of India
Companies listed on the Bombay Stock Exchange